Yeksinskoye is a rural locality (a village) in Nizhne-Vazhskoye Rural Settlement, Verkhovazhsky District, Vologda Oblast, Russia. The population was 57 as of 2002.

Geography 
Yeksinskoye is located 3 km northeast of Verkhovazhye (the district's administrative centre) by road. Somitsyno is the nearest rural locality.

References 

Rural localities in Verkhovazhsky District